Antoine Lefèvre de la Boderie (1555-1615) was a French diplomat and ambassador to England.

He was a son of Jacques Lefèvre de la Boderie and Anne de Montbray.

Career
Boderie was a master of household to Henry IV of France. In January 1598 he welcomed Sir Robert Cecil as ambassador to France at Dieppe. He was French ambassador to Rome, and ambassador in England from April 1606 until 1611. He is known for his commentary on politics in London during the reign of James VI and I. 

In 1606 Antoine Lefèvre de la Boderie noted that Prince Henry played golf, which he described as a Scottish game not unlike "pallemail" or pall-mall. Boderie also mentioned exercises with the pike and archery. Prince Henry's riding master, Monsieur St Antoine, asked Boderie to obtain a suit of gilt armour with a pistol and sword for the prince. The armour is thought to survive in the Royal Collection.

Boderie and the Nottingham scandal
Christian IV of Denmark visited his sister, Anne of Denmark, the wife of King James in London in 1606. When he was preparing to leave he had an argument with the Earl of Nottingham aboard ship about time and tide. The Danish king insisted it was two o'clock and waved two fingers at the Earl. Nottingham, or his wife Margaret Howard, Countess of Nottingham, thought he made a joke about their age difference. An angry correspondence ensued.

Arbella Stuart attempted to mediate in the scandal in letters to Christian's Scottish chamberlain, Sir Andrew Sinclair. Anne of Denmark asked James to banish the Countess of Nottingham from court.

Boderie was aware of the details of this quarrel and described it in his letters. He wrote of the age difference between Lady Nottingham and the Admiral. He described the argument on the Thames centering on a clock and the time of departure, and Christian IV two or three times indicating the time two o'clock with his fingers. Boderie knew that the Countess of Nottingham had written to Sinclair, and Anne of Denmark had expelled her from court, berating her as the grandchild of an illegitimate son of James V, (as a granddaughter of James Stewart, 1st Earl of Moray). His letters are an important source for our knowledge of the incident. Boderie said Anne of Denmark made the Earl and Countess of Nottingham unwelcome at their lodge in the park of Hampton Court in September. Boderie's version of these events was a source of amusement to Henry IV of France.

Plague in 1606
According to Boderie, in October 1606 Anne of Denmark was alarmed by the death of a servant in the buttery at Hampton Court, and intended to move to Oatlands. She discovered the plague was also in that vicinity and wanted to move to Greenwich Palace, but the plague was there too. She stayed at Hampton Court and sent Prince Charles to join Prince Henry at Richmond Palace. Anne of Denmark kept King James, who was at Royston, informed by messages sent with the Scottish courtiers Robert Anstruther and John Auchmoutie. James was happy with Anne's decision but some courtiers were critical. The Venetian ambassador Zorzi Giustinian also reported her decision.

Boderie wrote several times several times about enthusiasm for a promising silver mine in Scotland and the results of assays of ore from this "mine d'Ecosse". He commented sourly that even unprofitable silver mines were a public benefit by the creation of employment. Boderie returned to France for a time in 1609 and King James gave him a gold basin and ewer, made by the Welsh goldsmith John Williams. It is said that Anne of Denmark gave his wife, Jeanne le Prévost, the string of pearls that she was wearing.

Final years
He was in London again in January 1610 and awaited the return of King James from Royston. In February 1610 he attended a banquet with the Venetian ambassadors. King James wore a jewel on his hat with five large diamonds, possibly the Mirror of Great Britain. In March, Boderie was concerned by the fate of four French vine-dressers aboard ships about to sail for Virginia with the Governor General, Lord De La Warr. They had not been told that they had contracted to serve in the New World.

Boderie wrote that when King James heard the news of the assassination of Henry IV of France, he turned whiter than his shirt.

Antoine Lefèvre de la Boderie died in 1615.

His daughter from his first marriage to Anne de Pas, Catherine, married Robert Arnauld d'Andilly. Their son was Simon Arnauld, Marquis de Pomponne.

Boderie and the London stage 
Antoine Lefèvre de la Boderie was offended by George Chapman's, The Conspiracy and Tragedy of Charles, Duke of Byron, and complained to King James. He was particularly irritated by a scene in which the French Queen slapped the face of her husband's mistress.

Boderie mentions a play about a silver mine, performed in March or Lenten term 1608, by the Children of the Queen's Revels, and promptly closed after offending King James. The text has not survived. Boderie wrote that it slandered James, his Scottish mine, and his favourites. The play may have been themed around a new silver mine at Hilderston in Scotland which King James had recently taken into his own hands, as described in the letters of Sir Thomas Hamilton. Some scholars suggest that Boderie's mention of a Scottish mine, the King's mine d'Escosse in the play, was not primarily a reference to Hilderston, but rather to James' homosocial personal relations.

During hearings in Venice about the possible misconduct of the ambassador Antonio Foscarini, it was noted that Zorzi Giustinian had attended a performance of Pericles, accompanied by Antoine Lefèvre de la Boderie and his wife, and Octavian Lotti, the secretary of the Florentine ambassador.

References

External links
 Armour belonging to Prince Henry, Royal Collection Trust

1555 births
1615 deaths
17th-century French people
Ambassadors of France to England
French expatriates in the Kingdom of England